Hjalmar Karl Bergström (19 January 1907 – 30 March 2000) was a Swedish cross-country skier who won four medals at the world championships in 1929–1933. He competed at the 1936 Winter Olympics in the 50 km event and finished fourth, behind three fellow Swedes.

Cross-country skiing results
All results are sourced from the International Ski Federation (FIS).

Olympic Games

World Championships
 4 medals – (1 gold, 1 silver, 2 bronze)

References

External links

1907 births
2000 deaths
Swedish male cross-country skiers
FIS Nordic World Ski Championships medalists in cross-country skiing
Olympic cross-country skiers of Sweden
Cross-country skiers at the 1936 Winter Olympics
People from Kungälv Municipality
20th-century Swedish people